United Nations Security Council elections are held annually to select members of the United Nations Security Council.

Electoral system 
Each country has one vote.

List 

 January 1946 United Nations Security Council election
 November 1946 United Nations Security Council election
 1959 United Nations Security Council election
 1963 United Nations Security Council election
 1964 United Nations Security Council election
 1965 United Nations Security Council election
 1966 United Nations Security Council election
 1967 United Nations Security Council election
 1968 United Nations Security Council election
 1969 United Nations Security Council election
 1970 United Nations Security Council election
 1971 United Nations Security Council election
 1972 United Nations Security Council election
 1973 United Nations Security Council election
 1974 United Nations Security Council election
 1975 United Nations Security Council election
 1976 United Nations Security Council election
 1977 United Nations Security Council election
 1978 United Nations Security Council election
 1979 United Nations Security Council election
 1980 United Nations Security Council election
 1981 United Nations Security Council election
 1982 United Nations Security Council election
 1983 United Nations Security Council election
 1984 United Nations Security Council election
 1985 United Nations Security Council election
 1986 United Nations Security Council election
 1987 United Nations Security Council election
 1988 United Nations Security Council election
 1989 United Nations Security Council election
 1990 United Nations Security Council election
 1991 United Nations Security Council election
 1992 United Nations Security Council election
 1993 United Nations Security Council election
 1994 United Nations Security Council election
 1995 United Nations Security Council election
 1996 United Nations Security Council election
 1997 United Nations Security Council election
 1998 United Nations Security Council election
 1999 United Nations Security Council election
 2000 United Nations Security Council election
 2001 United Nations Security Council election
 2002 United Nations Security Council election
 2003 United Nations Security Council election
 2004 United Nations Security Council election
 2005 United Nations Security Council election
 2006 United Nations Security Council election
 2007 United Nations Security Council election
 2008 United Nations Security Council election
 2009 United Nations Security Council election
 2010 United Nations Security Council election
 2011 United Nations Security Council election
 2012 United Nations Security Council election
 2013 United Nations Security Council election
 2014 United Nations Security Council election
 2015 United Nations Security Council election
 2016 United Nations Security Council election
 2017 United Nations Security Council election
 2018 United Nations Security Council election
 2019 United Nations Security Council election
 2020 United Nations Security Council election
 2021 United Nations Security Council election
 2022 United Nations Security Council election
 2023 United Nations Security Council election
 2024 United Nations Security Council election
 2025 United Nations Security Council election
 2026 United Nations Security Council election
 2027 United Nations Security Council election

United Nations-related lists
United Nations Security Council